The fit-PC is a small, light, fan-less nettop computer manufactured by the Israeli company CompuLab.

Many fit-PC models are available. fit-PC 1.0 was introduced in July 2007, fit-PC Slim was introduced in September 2008, fit-PC 2 was introduced in May 2009, fit-PC 3 was introduced in early 2012, and fit-PC 4 was introduced spring 2014.  The device is power-efficient (fit-PC 1 was about 5 W) and therefore considered to be a green computing project, capable of using open source software and creating minimal electronic waste.

Current models

fit-PC2
On February 19, 2009, Compulab announced the fit-PC2, which is "a major upgrade to the fit-PC product line".
Detailed specifications for the fit-PC2 include an Intel Atom Z5xx Silverthorne processor (1.1/1.6/2.0 GHz options), up to 2GB of RAM, 160GB SATA Hard Drive, GigaBit LAN and more. The fit-PC2 is also capable of HD video playback. Its declared power consumption is only 6W, and according to the manufacturer, it saves 96% of the power used by a standard desktop. fit-PC2 is the most power efficient PC on the Energy-Star list.
The fit-PC2 is based on the GMA 500 (Graphics Media Accelerator). Unfortunately the open source driver included in Linux kernel 2.6.39 does not support VA-API video or OpenGL/3D acceleration.
The fit-PC2 is being phased out and is being replaced by the fitlet, the fitlet was designed to replace the groundbreaking (and still popular) CompuLab fit-PC2.

fit-PC2i
On December 2, 2009, Compulab announced the fit-PC2i, a fit-PC2 variation targeting networking and industrial applications.
fit-PC2i adds a second Gbit Ethernet port, Wake-on-LAN, S/PDIF output and RS-232 port, has two fewer USB ports, and no IR.

fit-PC3
The fit-PC3 has been released early 2012. 
See the fit-PC3 article.

fit-PC4
The fit-PC4 has been released spring 2014.

fitlet
The fitlet has been announced January 14, 2015.
It has 3 CPU/SoC variations, and 5 feature variations, though only 7 models have been announced so far.

Obsolete models

fit-PC Slim
On September 16, 2008, Compulab announced the Fit-PC Slim, which at 11 x 10 x 3 cm is smaller than fit-PC 1.0.

Hardware
fit-PC Slim uses 500 MHz AMD Geode LX800 processor and has 512mb soldered-on RAM. The computer includes a VGA output, a serial port with a custom connector, Ethernet, b/g WLAN, and 3 USB ports (2 on the front panel). The system has an upgradeable 2.5" 60GB ATA hard drive.

Software
fit-PC Slim has General Software BIOS supporting PXE and booting from a USB CDROM or USB thumb drive. It is pre-installed with either Windows Vista or with Ubuntu 8.10 and Gentoo Linux 2008.0 . Also Windows Embedded can be used, or pre-installed on a FlowDrive.

Availability
The fit-PC Slim end-of-life was announced on 19 June 2009 with the general availability of fit-PC2.

fit-PC 1.0
fit-PC 1.0 is an earlier model that has the following differences
 Limited to 256mb RAM
 No Wi-Fi
 Dual 100BaseT Ethernet
 Larger form factor - 12 x 11.6 x 4 cm
 Only 2 USB ports
 Hard disk is upgradeable
 No power button and indicator LEDs
 5 V power supply

See also
Trim-Slice, an ARM mini-computer also made by CompuLab
Industrial PC
Media center (disambiguation)
Media PC
Nettop

References

External links
 fit-PC website
 Compulab website
 fit-PC Australia website
 fit-PC2 Users forum
 fit-PC US Website

Computers and the environment
Israeli brands
Linux-based devices
Nettop
Products introduced in 2007